al-Husaisa is a village in Hadramaut, Yemen, about  east of the capital city of San'a. The village is accessible by taking an off-ramp from N-5 highway connecting Seiyun and Tarim.

The village is very sparse as there is only a few houses built and some farms.  The village is known as the place where the Shrine of Imam Ahmad al-Muhajir or Rubath al-Muhajir is located.

References

 Al-Husaisa
 Tomb of Ahmad bin Isa al-Muhajir

Populated places in Hadhramaut Governorate